Tomaž is the Slovene form of the male given name Thomas.

People
Bearers of these names include:
Tomaž Barada, Slovenian martial artist
Tomaž Čižman (born 1965), Slovenian alpine skier
Tomaž Humar (born 1969), Slovenian mountaineer
Anton Tomaž Linhart (1756–1795), Slovene playwright and historian
Tomaž Marušič (born 1932), Slovenian lawyer and politician
Tomaž Pengov, Slovenian guitar player 
Tomaž Pirih (born 1981), Slovenian rower
Tomaž Pisanski (born 1949), Slovenian mathematician
Tomaž Razingar, Slovenian ice hockey player
Tomaž Šalamun (born 1941), Slovenian poet

See also
Sveti Tomaž (disambiguation) (Saint Thomas), several places in Slovenia

Portuguese masculine given names
Slovene masculine given names